Elections to the French National Assembly were held in Tunisia on 2 June 1946 as part of the wider French elections. Two members were elected from the territory, with both seats won by the French Rally, which was linked with the Rally of Left Republicans. The seats were taken by Louis Brunet and Antoine Colonna, both of whom had previously been elected in the 1945 elections.

Results

References

1946 in Tunisia
Tunisia
Tunisia
1946 06
June 1946 events in Africa